Perumbadavam Sreedharan (born 12 February 1938) is a Malayalam author from Kerala, India. He is former Chairman of Kerala Sahitya Akademi. He has written several novels and short stories. One of his best known novels is Oru Sankeerthanam Pole (1993) for which he won the Vayalar Award in 1996. He got Kerala Sahitya Akademi Award for his novel Ashtapadi. In 2006, he was awarded the Malayattoor Award for his novel, Narayanam.

Born in the village of Perumpadavam, in Elanji Panchayath Piravom, Ernakulam district of Kerala, Perumpadavam (as he is often called) started his literary career by writing poetry. He later shifted to short stories and novels. Perumpadavam has also authored scripts for 12 Malayalam films. He has been noted for his connection with the Russian language and is recognised by some as a doyen of Malayalam literature.

Oru Sankeerthanam Pole

The novel Oru Sankeerthanam Pole was first published in 1993 and was released in its 37th edition on 1 November 2008 after setting publishing records in 2005. It is a story based on the life of famous Russian writer, Fyodor Dostoyevsky and his wife Anna.
This highly successful novel has sold over 100,000 copies in about 12 years. This is a record in Malayalam literature. The book surpassed 100th edition, with above 200,000 copies in about 24 years.

List of works

Perumpadavam's works include:

Novels

Short story collections

Children's literature

Other works

Awards
 1975: Kerala Sahitya Akademi Award for Novel (Ashtapadi)
 1980: Kerala State Film Award for Best Story (Surya Daham)
 1980: Kerala Film Critics Association Award for Best Story (Surya Daham)
 1983: Kerala Film Critics Association Award for Best Story (Ashtapadi)
 1996: Vayalar Award (Oru Sankeerthanam Pole)
 1996: Bala Sahitya Award by Kerala State Institute of Children's Literature (Nilavinte Bhangi)
 2013: Vallathol Award
 2020: Kerala Sahitya Akademi Fellowship
 2006: Malayattoor Award (Narayanam)
 2014: Thakazhi Award
 2020: Benigna Award

References

Novelists from Kerala
Malayali people
Malayalam-language writers
Malayalam novelists
Malayalam-language dramatists and playwrights
Living people
1938 births
Recipients of the Kerala Sahitya Akademi Award
People from Muvattupuzha
Indian male dramatists and playwrights
20th-century Indian dramatists and playwrights
Screenwriters from Kerala
Malayalam screenwriters
20th-century Indian male writers